Sharqonj (also Romanized as Shārqonj, Shahrghunj, and Shahr-e Qonj; also known as Mashār Qonj and Shārqonj-e Bālā) is a village in Alqurat Rural District, in the Central District of Birjand County, South Khorasan Province, Iran. At the 2006 census, its population was 84, in 38 families.

References 

Populated places in Birjand County